Karimpur is a census town, near the bank of river Jalangi, in Karimpur I CD block in the Tehatta subdivision of the Nadia district in the Indian state of West Bengal.

Geography

Location

Area overview
Nadia district is made up of mostly alluvial plains lying to the east of Hooghly River, locally known as Bhagirathi. The alluvial plains are cut across by such distributaries as Jalangi, Churni and Ichhamati. With these rivers getting silted up, floods are a recurring feature. The Tehatta subdivision, presented in the map alongside, is topographically part of the Nadia Plain North. The Jalangi River forms the district/subdivision border in the north-western part and then flows through the subdivision. The other important rivers are Mathabhanga and Bhairab. The eastern portion forms the boundary with Bangladesh. The subdivision is overwhelmingly rural. 97.15% of the population lives in the rural areas and 2.85% lives in the urban areas.

Note: The map alongside presents some of the notable locations in the subdivision. All places marked in the map are linked in the larger full screen map. All the four subdivisions are presented with maps on the same scale – the size of the maps vary as per the area of the subdivision.

Demographics
According to the 2011 Census of India, Karimpur had a total population of 9,661, of which 4,930 (51%) were males and 4,731 (49%) were females. Population in the age range 0–6 years was 775. The total number of literate persons in Karimpur was 7,616 (85.71% of the population over 6 years).

Civic administration

Police station
Karimpur police station has jurisdiction over a portion of Karimpur I CD block.

Infrastructure
Its civic amenities include  of road, the protected water supply involved overhead tank, tap water from untreated sources, and hand pumps. It has 4,000 domestic electric connections and 250 road lighting points. Among its medical facilities are four medicine shops. Among its educational facilities are seven primary schools, one middle school, one secondary school, and one senior secondary school. It has four recognised shorthand, typewriting and vocational training institutions. Three important commodities are PVC items, rexin bags, and muri. Two nationalised bank offices are located there, as well as two cooperative banks, one agricultural credit society and one non-agricultural credit society.

Economy 
The local commerce is based on export of jute, banana, cucumber, brinjal, onion, with other vegetables, grain and beetel leaves. The town boasts nearly 3000 shops and 120 small industrial units (SIU). There are a number of the Marwari population who control the jute business. Apart from this, the transportation business is also on the roll. There is a regulated market near Karimpur Bajar.

Education 
 
Karimpur has three high schools: Karimpur Jagannath High School, Karimpur Girls High School and Jamsherpur B.N High School. One undergraduate college named Karimpur Pannadevi College is there. Many B.Ed. colleges, primary teacher training institute and other study centres of open universities and management studies are located there, as well as many kindergarten schools of both Bengali and English medium and primary schools.

Culture 

Like any other town of new settlers, people in general are more liberal than orthodox. Throughout the year, cultural and religious festivals are celebrated. Nou Byich (boat racing and sailing) on Vijaya Dashami (the last day of Durga Puja) was the most famous and unique celebration in Karimpur, which is no longer celebrated. More than four hundred river boats participate in this unique festival. Other festivals like Saraswati puja and Kali Puja are celebrated with great enthusiasm. One of the earliest scholarly studies of Karimpur social and cultural life was undertaken in the 1920s by William and Charlotte Wiser and published in 1930 by the University of California under the title Behind Mud Walls, which was then enlarged and revised in a second edition in 1963, and a third in 1971. The work provides fascinating anthropological detail and insight into the lives of Karimpur villagers of the early 20th century.

Health

Karimpur has one rural hospital and many dispensaries. Some specialist doctors visit on a specific day each week in different clinics.

Communication 

The town is situated near the international border of India-Bangladesh ( from the main town). West Bengal state highway 11 crosses through it. The communication primarily depends on bus route from Krishnanagar to Karimpur. From the other end it can be accessed by Berhampore to Karimpur bus route.

References

Cities and towns in Nadia district